Crawford-Cabral's shaggy rat or Crawford-Cabral's shaggy marsh rat (Dasymys cabrali) is a species of shaggy marsh rat endemic to north-eastern Namibia, near the Okavango River.

See also
List of mammals of Namibia

References

Mammals described in 2003
Mammals of Namibia
Dasymys